Anthony Lawson Jude Ifeanyichukwu Obiawunaotu or Anthony Lawson Obi (born March 24, 1988), better known by his stage name Fat Tony, is a Nigerian-American rapper.

He has been recognized in URBs "Next 1000", a list of emerging new artists anticipated to break through. At the Houston Press Music Awards, he won the Best Underground Hip Hop award in 2008, 2009, and 2010, as well as the Best Solo Rapper award in 2013.

Early life
Fat Tony grew up in the Third Ward area of Houston, Texas. Anthony Onyebuchi Obi, Fat Tony's father, is an engineer, and his mother Johnnie is a housewife. His mother sang opera and exposed him to rock and pop music such as The Beatles and The Rolling Stones. His father is stated to have exposed the artist to acts like Bob Marley and Jimmy Cliff as well as music from his home country, Nigeria. Fat Tony's father, an Igbo, fought in the Biafran War in Nigeria before coming to Houston. Growing up, he became a fan of Nirvana. He stated in an interview that the first album he ever bought was an album from child rap duo Kris Kross whom he was inspired by due to the fact that they were kids. In middle school he formed a rap group with his friends called Simply Throwed. In high school he performed in a rap group called The Low Ends. He continued playing in bands with friends throughout his school days. Fat Tony attended Carnegie Vanguard High School (Class of 2006) and the University of St. Thomas. He also studied as a communications major at the University of Houston.

Career
Fat Tony's debut studio album, RABDARGAB, was released in 2010. The album's title is a reference to the late 1990s Houston Independent School District campaign ("Read a book, do a report, get a buck") aimed at students to promote literacy by offering $1 to students in exchange for book reports. In 2012, he released a collaborative album with producer Tom Cruz, titled Double Dragon, on Young One Records.

In 2013, he released Smart Ass Black Boy on Young One Records. Produced by Tom Cruz, the album was written in two days and recorded in four days in Los Angeles, California. It was included on the year-end lists by Complex, Houston Press, and Vice.

In 2017, he released MacGregor Park on First One Up. The album's title refers to MacGregor Park in Houston. It was included on the year-end lists by Bandcamp Daily and Houston Press.

In 2018, Fat Tony released 10,000 Hours on Don Giovanni Records. Written and recorded in Los Angeles, the album was produced in large part by Hevln.

In 2019, Fat Tony served as a host on the nightly live variety show Vice Live on Viceland along with Marie Faustin, Sandy Honig, and Zack Fox.

In 2020, he released a collaborative album with producer Taydex, titled Wake Up, on Carpark Records.

On October 23, 2020, he released the album Exotica on Carpark Records.

Style and influences
Fat Tony has cited Ramones, Prince, Michael Jackson, Black Flag, Bad Brains, Morrissey, the Smiths, E-40, Jay-Z, Nas, the Notorious B.I.G., Tupac Shakur, UGK, Outkast, DJ Screw, Three 6 Mafia, Mac Dre, Too Short, Aaliyah, R. Kelly, My Bloody Valentine, Nirvana, Rick Rubin, Beastie Boys, Scarface, Devin the Dude, Kilo Ali, Ice Cube, Snoop Dogg, Mannie Fresh, Bikini Kill, Lil B, A Tribe Called Quest, and De La Soul as his music influences.

Discography

Studio albums
 RABDARGAB (2010)
 Double Dragon (2012) 
 Smart Ass Black Boy (2013)
 MacGregor Park (2017)
 House with a Pool (2018) 
 10,000 Hours (2018)
 Wake Up (2020) 
 Exotica (2020)

Remix albums
 SCREWDARGAB (2011) 
 MacGregor Park (Chopnotslop Remix) (2017)

Live albums
 Live at No Audience (2020)

Compilation albums
 The Creation of Fat Tony (2009)

Mixtapes
 RABDARGAB: The EPreview (2010)

EPs
 Love Life (2008)
 Look (2016) 
 Urban Hall of Fame (2016) 
 Snak Pak (2018) 
 Full Circle (2018)

Singles
 "Hood Party" (2013)
 "BKNY (Remix)" (2013)
 "No More" b/w "Love Me" (2014)
 "Sushi" (2015)
 "Dame Un Beso" (2016)
 "Twin Peaks" (2017)
 "Two for One" (2017)
 "Son of God" (2017)
 "Growth Spurt" b/w "Northside Dr." (2018)
 "FWU" (2018)
 "Don't Move" b/w "Can't Stay" (2020)
 "Gambling Man" (Mariachi Remix) (2020)
 "Ain't for Me" (2021)
 "Ain't for Me" (Blockhead Remix) (2020)

Guest appearances
 SMKA - "'Til It's Gone" and "I'm on Fire" from SMKA: The 808 Experiment Vol. 1 (2008)
 DJ Sly - "Killin' Time" from Beyond It (2009)
 Juiceboxxx - "Boxxx Get Busy" from Journeyman from the Heartland (2010)
 Das Racist - "Luv It Mayne" from Sit Down, Man (2010)
 Tecla - "Beautiful Problems" from Strangers Revisited (2011)
 ASAP Rocky - "Get Lit" from Live. Love. ASAP (2011)
 Tecla - "No Music" from Thanksgiving (2011)
 Hot Sugar - "Leverage" from Midi Murder (2012)
 Big Baby Gandhi - "Lurkin'" from No1 2 Look Up 2 (2012)
 Mishka & Rad Reef - "Hyperbolic Chamber Music" (2012)
 Heems - "Bangles" from Nehru Jackets (2012)
 Antwon - "Laugh Now: Hot Sugar Version" (2013)
 Tecla - "Bed of Roses" and "Mayo on the Side" from Bruja (2013)
 Steel Tipped Dove - "Sprung" from Steel Tipped Dove & a Whole Bunch of Crazy Motherfuckers (2013)
 Kool & Kass - "Burtation" from Peaceful Solutions (2013)
 Weekend Money - "Trapper Keeper" from Freddie Merkury (2014)
 Shy Girls - "Without (Magic Fades Remix)" (2014)
 Donwill & Dash Speaks - "Sixteen Tons" from Don Speaks (2014)
 Kari Faux - "Stainless" from Laugh Now, Die Later (2014)
 Tony Collins - "Take You Home" from Last Night (2014)
 Cakes da Killa - "I Run This Club Remix" from I Run This Club (2014)
 Puzzle - "All the Best" from Tighten the Reins (2017)
 Black Midi - "Jam" and "bmbmbm" from Black Midi Live in the USA (2020)

See also

 Culture of Houston
 History of African Americans in Houston
 List of Nigerian Americans

References

External links
 
 

1988 births
Living people
Igbo rappers
African-American male rappers
Rappers from Houston
Southern hip hop musicians
University of Houston alumni
University of St. Thomas (Texas) alumni
American people of Igbo descent
21st-century American rappers
21st-century American male musicians
Don Giovanni Records artists
Carpark Records artists
21st-century African-American musicians
20th-century African-American people